Victoria County is an historical county and census division of Nova Scotia, Canada. Local government is provided by the Municipality of the County of Victoria and the Wagmatcook 1 reserve.

History
Named after Queen Victoria, it was established by statute in 1851. Cape Breton County was divided into two separate counties in that year, with the northern portion becoming Victoria County.

Like other parts of Nova Scotia, the county was sparsely inhabited by the Miꞌkmaq, who hunted in the area.

The earliest settlers of Victoria County were almost exclusively Loyalists, with most arriving from the United States in the years following the American Revolutionary War. It was noted by historian G.G. Patterson in 1885 that "In (Queen Victoria's) broad domain upon which the sun never sets, we venture to say there dwell none more loyal than (Victoria County's) few thousand inhabitants".

The man responsible for the early settling of Victoria County is widely considered to be Capt. Jonathan Jones, a Loyalist who originally captained a ship bringing applicants to the area who had received land grants in the late 1700s. Among these was a Mr. Cuyler, the former Mayor of Albany, NY, who had forfeited his holdings due to his loyalty to the British Crown and who was eager to settle in the Cape Breton colony. Cape Breton had been separated from the mainland and was declared a colony unto itself in 1784. Jones’ land grant bears the date October 19, 1790. Jones was appointed magistrate and given the land and all wood upon it with the exception of the white pine, which were reserved for the King's use along with all mines and minerals. Jones was required to annually pay two shillings for every hundred acres to begin after the expiration of ten years. For every fifty acres of farmable land, Jones was required to clear and cultivate at least three acres and for every fifty acres of land deemed barren, he was required to keep upon it three cattle, until such time as three acres for every fifty be cleared. He was required also to erect a place of dwelling measuring no less than twenty feet in length and sixteen in breadth. Should any ground be rocky, he was by the terms of the grant compelled to employ a quarry or mine, employing one able man for every fifty acres. Should any of these conditions not be met, Jones’ grant would become void.
 
Any settler who wished to come into possession of a part of this land would make the following declaration, failure of which to do so resulted in the purchase being null and void:

Under Jones, many improvements were made, including the construction of Victoria County's first sawmill, followed by a second sawmill at the mouth of the Baddeck River. Large crops of potatoes were subsequently produced in Victoria County, and ships would routinely carry this farm produce to Newfoundland for sale.

Though Jones is regarded as the first settler in Victoria County, local legend had some six or seven families settling at present-day Englishtown a few years prior to his arrival. An elderly Englishtown resident, well acquainted with the early history of the area, in the late 1880s told historian G.G. Patterson that the earliest settlers had arrived there between 1770 and 1780. Though Patterson believed these families had indeed settled there, he regarded the timeline as impossible, believing they could not have come before 1782 and that they most likely did not arrive until at least five years later. Patterson's research indicated that these six or seven families reached St. Anne's (as Englishtown was then known) at different times and by different routes in fishing vessels. They were chiefly English (surviving records identify two families as Guinn and Roberts), but records show one family from Ireland and a bachelor from Virginia who, a few years later, went insane and hung himself. Eight years later a German family named Willhausen arrived, and records show no further settlers arriving until an influx of Scots some 40 years later. Little attention was given to farming and the small community survived on the fishery. Little is known about these earliest settlers due to the fact that their immediate descendants subsequently emigrated to other areas in search of better conditions.

The chief means of transport was canoe by river and ship by sea, as no roads existed. A rather extensive network of paths and trails developed over time through the forests. Some communities such as Black Point were completely isolated, and remained so well into the twentieth century.

In a report dated December 11, 1861, it is noted that Victoria County at that time was settled largely by Scotch highlanders from the mainland and western islands of Scotland, with a few settlers from England, Ireland, and "the low countries".  The report noted "a great want" felt by these settlers for regular marts and fairs "where seeds, cattle, etc. could be exchanged with mutual advantages, and possibly new articles of culture introduced, that for want of the facilities requisite for obtaining these, are never attempted to be raised by the county."

Though the census of 1818 gives no number, written accounts dating from 1820 state the population of the area from Cape North south to Big Bras d’Or  as being "no more than 100 families" at that time.

Demographics 

Population trend

Mother tongue language (2011)

Ethnic Groups (2006)

Communities

Villages
Baddeck

Unincorporated settlements
Ingonish

Reserves
Wagmatcook 1

County municipality and county subdivisions
Municipality of the County of Victoria
Victoria, Subd. A
Victoria, Subd. B

Government and politics
The county is administered by the Municipality of the County of Victoria. The federal Electoral Riding is Sydney—Victoria.

Access Routes
Highways and numbered routes that run through the county, including external routes that start or finish at the county limits:

Highways

Trunk Routes
Cabot Trail

Collector Routes:

External Routes:
None

See also
 List of counties of Nova Scotia

References

External links

Municipality of Victoria County website
Visit Victoria County Official Tourism website
Central Cape Breton
Visit Baddeck
North Shore Community Portal
Cape Breton Highlands
Hike the Highlands Festival,
Photographs of historic monuments in Victoria County
Victoria County CAP Site Association